St Margaret's Church is in Station Road, High Bentham, North Yorkshire, England. It is an Anglican parish church in the deanery of Ewecross, the archdeaconry of Craven, and the Diocese of Leeds. Its benefice is united with that of St John the Baptist, Low Bentham. The church is recorded in the National Heritage List for England as a designated Grade II listed building.

History
St Margaret's was built in 1837. It was extended in 1901–02 by the Lancaster architects Austin and Paley. The additions included a new chancel, transepts, organ chamber and vestries. The plaster ceiling was removed from the nave, which was reseated, and a tower screen and pulpit were installed. These alterations cost £2,014. The church was closed in 2012 and subsequently converted into two private homes. The congregation either meets at St Boniface's Roman Catholic Church, or at St John's Church in Low Bentham.

Architecture
The church is constructed in stone, with a slate roof. Its plan consists of a four-bay nave, a two-bay chancel with a north vestry and a south chapel, and a west tower. The tower has octagonal angle turrets, and an embattled parapet. It is in three stages, with a west doorway in the bottom stage. The middle stage contains a stepped triple window, and in the top stage are two-light bell openings. Along the sides of the nave are four two-light lancet windows. The chapel has two-light windows on the north and south sides, and a three-light window on the east. The east end of the chancel has a four-light window containing trefoil plate tracery. The two-manual pipe organ was built in 1893, and rebuilt in 1937 by Henry Ainscough of Preston.

See also

List of ecclesiastical works by Austin and Paley (1895–1914)

References

Church of England church buildings in North Yorkshire
Grade II listed churches in North Yorkshire
Gothic Revival church buildings in England
Gothic Revival architecture in North Yorkshire
Churches completed in 1902
Anglican Diocese of Leeds
Austin and Paley buildings